The marble-faced bristle tyrant (Pogonotriccus ophthalmicus) is a species of passerine bird in the family Tyrannidae. This species is sometimes placed in the genus Phylloscartes. It is found in Bolivia, Colombia, Ecuador, Peru, and Venezuela.  Its natural habitat is subtropical or tropical moist montane forests.

References

Further reading
</ref>

marble-faced bristle tyrant
Birds of the Northern Andes
marble-faced bristle tyrant
marble-faced bristle tyrant
Taxonomy articles created by Polbot